The 2020 Italian Basketball Cup, known as the 2020 Zurich Connect Final Eight for sponsorship reasons, was the 52nd edition of Italy's national cup tournament. The competition is managed by the Lega Basket for LBA clubs. The tournament was played from 13 to 16 February 2020 in Pesaro, at the end of the first half of the 2019–20 LBA season.

Vanoli Cremona were the defending champions.

Umana Reyer Venezia went to win its first Cup ever by beating Happy Casa Brindisi 73–67 in the Finals. Austin Daye was named Panasonic MVP of the competition.

All times are in Central European Time (UTC+01:00)''.

Qualification
Qualified for the tournament are selected based on their position on the league table at the end of the first half of the 2019–20 LBA regular season.

Bracket

Quarterfinals

AX Armani Exchange Milano vs. Vanoli Cremona

Segafredo Virtus Bologna vs. Umana Reyer Venezia

Banco di Sardegna Sassari vs. Happy Casa Brindisi

Germani Basket Brescia vs. Pompea Fortitudo Bologna

Semifinals

AX Armani Exchange Milano vs. Umana Reyer Venezia

Happy Casa Brindisi vs. Pompea Fortitudo Bologna

Final

Umana Reyer Venezia vs. Happy Casa Brindisi

Sponsors

Source:

References

External links
LBA Final Eight official website

2019–20 in Italian basketball
Italian Basketball Cup
Italian Basketball Cup